Massachusetts House of Representatives' 5th Essex district in the United States is one of 160 legislative districts included in the lower house of the Massachusetts General Court. It covers part of Essex County. Democrat Ann-Margaret Ferrante of Gloucester has represented the district since 2009.

Locales represented
The district includes the following localities:
 Essex
 Gloucester
 Rockport

The current district geographic boundary overlaps with that of the Massachusetts Senate's 1st Essex and Middlesex district.

Former locales
The district previously covered:
 Boxford, circa 1872 
 Georgetown, circa 1872 
 Groveland, circa 1872

Representatives
 Charles Howes, circa 1858 
 Luther Allen, circa 1859 
 Harry Millett Eames, circa 1888 
 William John Hinchcliffe, circa 1888 
 Robert W. Dow, circa 1920 
 William L. Stedman, circa 1920 
 J. Everett Collins, circa 1951 
 Frank S. Giles, Jr., circa 1951 
 William Longworth, circa 1951 
 Peter C. McCarthy, circa 1975 
 Patricia G. Fiero, 1984-1991 
 Richard R. Silva
 Patricia Fiero
 Bruce Tarr
 Anthony Verga
 Ann-Margaret Ferrante, 2009-current

See also
 List of Massachusetts House of Representatives elections
 Other Essex County districts of the Massachusetts House of Representatives: 1st, 2nd, 3rd, 4th,  6th, 7th, 8th, 9th, 10th, 11th, 12th, 13th, 14th, 15th, 16th, 17th, 18th
 Essex County districts of the Massachusett Senate: 1st, 2nd, 3rd; 1st Essex and Middlesex; 2nd Essex and Middlesex
 List of Massachusetts General Courts
 List of former districts of the Massachusetts House of Representatives

Images

References

External links
 Ballotpedia
  (State House district information based on U.S. Census Bureau's American Community Survey).
 League of Women Voters Cape Ann

House
Government of Essex County, Massachusetts